Mokhovskoye is a rural locality (a selo) and the administrative center of Mokhovsky Selsoviet, Aleysky District, Altai Krai, Russia. The population was 854 as of 2013. There are 18 streets.

Geography 
Mokhovskoye is located 27 km northwest of Aleysk (the district's administrative centre) by road. Druzhba is the nearest rural locality.

References 

Rural localities in Aleysky District